Lee Hwa-jun (born 16 February 1996) is a South Korean taekwondo practitioner. In 2018, he won the silver medal in the men's 80 kg event at the 2018 Asian Games held in Jakarta, Indonesia. In the final, he lost against Nikita Rafalovich of Uzbekistan.

References

External links 
 

Living people
1996 births
Place of birth missing (living people)
South Korean male taekwondo practitioners
Taekwondo practitioners at the 2018 Asian Games
Medalists at the 2018 Asian Games
Asian Games silver medalists for South Korea
Asian Games medalists in taekwondo
21st-century South Korean people